Kiilh-sooh-kwa (var. Kiilhsoohkwa, Kil-so-quah, Kilsoquah, Margaret Revarre) was a member of the Myaamia Nation and granddaughter of Myaamia Chief Mihšihkinaahkwa (var. Little Turtle). She was born in 1810 and died in 1915. She was one of the few Myaamia who was not removed from Indiana in 1846.

Early life 
Kiilh-sooh-kwa was born in 1810 in an area she described in an interview in 1906 as near present-day Markle, Huntington County in northeast Indiana. Separate sources suggest she was born at the Forks of the Wabash, closer to present-day Huntington, Huntington County, Indiana. She was the granddaughter of Myaamia Chief Mihšihkinaahkwa (var. Little Turtle). Her father, Wok-shin-gah (var. Crescent Moon) was Mihšihkinaahkwa's son. Her mother was Nah-wah-kah-mo-kwa (var. Snow Woman).

Her first husband was John Owl, the son of Chief John Owl. In 1826, the pair wed in an area referred to as Seek's Village around the Eel River. John died within the first year or two of their marriage. In 1832, Kiilh-sooh-kwa wed Shaw-pe-nom-quah (var. Anthony Revarre), who was of half Native American, half French descent trader. Together Kiilh-sooh-kwa and Shaw-pe-nom-quah had six children, four of whom died in infancy. Her two surviving children were a son, Wa-pe-mung-quah (var. Little White Loon, Anthony Revarre, Jr.), and a daughter, Wan-nog-quan-quah (var. Snow, Mist, or Fog; Blowing Snow; Happy Fawn; Mary E. Johnson).

Later life 
Little is documented of her young adult life, though in 2013 she was described by the Smithsonian Institution as an important midwife in Indiana who understood and used plant knowledge related to childbirth. In her later years, she lived in Roanoke, Indiana, on but forty acres of what remained of her family's and her nation's territory. She only spoke in her native language, despite some sources suggesting that she understood some English. One of the few English words that she knew and used frequently was "rheumatism," given her affliction with the disease. She was described in 1905 as "a big woman, of swarthy appearance, and...a devotee of the pipe, which she has with her almost incessantly" and, separately, was described as a devout Catholic.

In 1915, a Fort Wayne-based newspaper reported that, "if a stranger called, the old woman would grasp the hand and give a firm grip, and after looking you over would in her quaint way and feeble voice mutter a few words in her native tongue, that if interpreted would be a hearty welcome." An estimated 15,000 attendees celebrated her 100th birthday in Roanoke and her centennial was well-documented in Indiana newspapers.

She died on 4 September 1915 at her home in Roanoke after spending a few weeks ill and confined to her bed. Her death was described as "without a struggle, for death was only a break in the well worn thread of life." Her passing was characterized in 1917 as a loss of "the last royal Miamis and the oldest resident of the State of Indiana, who had enjoyed a national reputation." Her funeral services were held at St. Joseph Catholic Church in Roanoke and she was buried in the I.O.O.F. Cemetery (Glenwood Cemetery) in Roanoke.

References 

Miami people
Algonquin people
Native Americans in Indiana
Native American history of Indiana
1915 deaths
1810 births